Sampo Generation ("Three giving-up generation") is a neologism in South Korea referring to a generation that gives up courtship, marriage, and having kids. Many of the young generation in South Korea have given up those three things because of social pressures and economic problems such as increasing cost-of-living, tuition payments, and affordable housing scarcity. There is also the opo sedae, or "five giving-up generation", which takes the same three and adds employment and home ownership. The chilpo sedae ("seven giving-up generation") further includes interpersonal relationships and hope, while the gupo sedae ("nine giving-up generation") extends to physical health and appearance. Finally, the sippo sedae ("ten giving-up generation") or wanpo sedae ("total giving-up generation") culminates in giving up life. The Sampo generation is similar to the Satori generation in Japan.

The origin of the word
This term was used by the special reports team of Kyunghyang Shinmun in the 2011 publication "Talking About the Welfare State". They defined Sampo generation members as those with unstable jobs, high student loan payments, precarious preparations for employment, etc., and who postponed love, marriage, and childbirth without any prospective plans. The report argued that the burden of starting a family in South Korea was so high because of the government's preference to delegate social welfare duties to families themselves. The emergence of the Sampo generation demonstrates that the structure of the traditional family unit was disintegrating at an alarming rate, according to the report. This word and its definition rapidly spread through various media and the Internet.
The term means "three abandoning generation" or "three giving up generation", referring to the three things the Sampo generation is giving up on: courtship, marriage and children.

New economics of marriage
Regarding this term, Korean marriage trends are changing. According to marriage consultancy Duo, over 34 percent of 1,446 women surveyed prioritized financial capability and job in choosing a future husband, followed by 30 percent putting greatest importance on personality and 9 percent on looks. In modern society, singledom has arguably become a greater problem than unemployment, not because people have failed to meet the right one, but because they lack the economic power to marry and start their own families.

Research

Reason to be Sampo Generation in South Korea

And also, with the exception of a group of owners who would not give up anything, four types of abandonment were found, with uncertainty of the order of 27.36% of the total samples, 19.92% of the actualist, 13.24% of the self-absorbed type and 8.70% of the suspended type.

Similar issues in other countries

 In the United States, many  Millennials and late Generation X also belong to the Boomerang Generation which live with their parents after they would normally be considered old enough to live on their own. This social phenomenon is mainly caused by high unemployment rates coupled with various economic downturns, and in turn, many Boomerang children postpone romance and marriage due to economic hardship. 
 In Japan, the generation of youths in the 10 to 20s range since around 2010 is called the "Satori generation". They are similar to the "Sampo Generation". Typically, they are not interested in luxury items, trips abroad, money, and successful careers. 
  In Europe, there are several terms and groups comparable to the "Sampo generation". In Greece, they are called the 700 euro generation. These youngsters often work at temporary jobs and receive the minimum allowable salary of 700 euros a month. The term began to appear in 2008.
 In China, a popular phenomenon called "Tang ping", or lying flat that describe Chinese youth denies to stand with social pressures such as hard work or even overwork, lowering the desire and wants.

See also 
 9X Generation
 Buddha-like mindset
 Hell Joseon
 N-po generation
 Spoon class theory
 Strawberry generation
 Tang ping
 Working poor

References

External links

Cultural generations
South Korean culture
2010s neologisms
Economy of South Korea